Salahi may refer to:
Places
Salahi, Khuzestan, a village in Razavi Khorasan Province, Iran
Salahi, Razavi Khorasan, a village in Razavi Khorasan Province, Iran

People
 Adil Salahi, editor of Arab News, a Saudi newspaper
 Michaele and Tareq Salahi ("the Salahis"), known as perpetrators of the 2009 U.S. state dinner security breaches
Michaele Salahi, cast member on The Real Housewives of D.C. and ex-wife of Tareq
Tareq Salahi, former vintner
Mohamedou Ould Salahi, author of a memoir of his incarceration at Guantanamo

See also
 Salehi
 Salehi, Iran (disambiguation)